The Kowloon Group of Reservoirs is located in the Kam Shan Country Park, north of Kowloon, Hong Kong. They include:
 Kowloon Reservoir 
 Kowloon Byewash Reservoir 
 Kowloon Reception Reservoir (Eption Reservoir) 
Also located in the Kam Shan Country Park is the Shek Lei Pui Reservoir. Taken together the capacity of the reservoirs is 2.9 million cubic metres.

History
The Kowloon Reservoir was the first of the group to be built. Construction commenced in 1907 and it was completed in 1910, making it the first reservoir in the New Territories. On completion, the capacity was 353 mg. The total cost of construction was $619,000. 

The Shek Lei Pui Reservoir was completed in 1925 with a capacity of 116 mg.

The Kowloon Reception Reservoir was completed in 1926.

The Kowloon Byewash Reservoir was completed in 1931 with a capacity of 185 mg.

Construction of a water tunnel connecting the Kowloon Byewash Reservoir to the Lower Shing Mun Reservoir started in 2019. The project is scheduled to be completed in 2022. The Inter-reservoirs Transfer Scheme (IRTS) consists mainly of a water tunnel, 2.8 km in length and 3 m in diameter, connecting the two reservoirs. The purpose of the tunnel is to reduce the quantity of the overflow from the Kowloon Group of Reservoirs into the Lai Chi Kok Transfer Scheme (LCKTS) and to make better use of the water collected by the Kowloon Group of Reservoirs which will otherwise overflow into the Butterfly Valley and discharge into the sea.

Conservation
5 Historic Structures of Kowloon Reservoir have been declared as monuments. They are:
 Main Dam (1901-1910)
 Main Dam Valve House (1901-1910)
 Spillway Dam (1901-1910)
 Spillway Dam Recorder House (1901-1910)
 Recorder House (1901-1910)

See also
List of reservoirs of Hong Kong
Water supply and sanitation in Hong Kong

References

External links

Hong Kong Water Supplies Department: Kowloon Reservoir
Waterworks for a Century